Eugenia Bianchi (born 15 January 1990) is an Italian field hockey player for the Italian national team. Born in Buenos Aires, Argentina. She started her professional field  hockey career in 2015. 

She participated at the 2018 Women's Hockey World Cup.
- Kuala Lumpur World League 2017
- Brussels World League 2017
- Cardiff European Championship II 2017
- London World Cup 2018 
- Valencia World Series 2019
- Glasgow European Championship II 2019

References

1990 births
Living people
Italian female field hockey players
Female field hockey defenders
Expatriate field hockey players
Italian expatriate sportspeople in Spain